Fú or Foo (符) is a Chinese surname meaning “tally” in ancient Chinese, referring to the Zhou dynasty Fu (tally). Its use as a surname derives from the post name Fu Xi Ling (符璽令), which was borne by Gong Ya, grandson of Duke Qing of Lu who later migrated to Qin. According to the Oxford Dictionary of Family Names on Britain and Ireland: “This was a post held by the man in charge of the tally given by a ruler to a general to deploy troops or to an envoy as his credentials.”

It is the 142nd-most common name, shared by 0.082% of the population or 1,090,000 people, with the province with the most being Hainan.

Notable people
Li Cunshen (862 – June 16, 924); whose surname Li was given by emperor.
Fu Rong (苻融, died 222 AD) – A general of Liu Bei's state of Shu Han during the Three Kingdoms period who was legendary for his bravery in the face of certain death against Sun Quan's forces
Fu Jian (317–355): 苻堅/苻坚; 337–385), courtesy name Yonggu (永固) or Wenyu (文玉), formally Emperor Xuanzhao of (Former) Qin ((前)秦宣昭帝), was an emperor (who, however, used the title "Heavenly King" (Tian Wang) during his reign) of the Chinese/Di state Former Qin
Fu Jian (337–385), an emperor (who, however, used the title "Heavenly King" (Tian Wang) during his reign) of the Chinese/Di state Former Qin
Fu Yaning (born July 14, 1997), is a singer and actress
Foo Chin Chin (符真真 Fǔ Zhēnzhēn; 1971-1990), a Singaporean and one of the victims of the 1990 Ng Soo Hin murders

 Individual Chinese surnames